Constantin Luca (born 26 May 1969) is a Romanian former professional footballer who played for Samsunspor in Turkey for one season.

Career statistics

Club

Notes

References

1969 births
Living people
Romanian footballers
Association football forwards
Süper Lig players
Samsunspor footballers
Romanian expatriate footballers
Romanian expatriate sportspeople in Turkey
Expatriate footballers in Turkey